Michael Doyle (born 18 June 1987 in Glasgow) is a British racing driver who competed in the British Touring Car Championship in 2008. Doyle's team was family-owned, and part of a garage services business which he worked for during the week. He was not among the front-runners in his aged Honda Civic, and was not among the top 10 non-works drivers to finish until race 7 at Donington Park. He ran 10th for part of race 6 at Rockingham, before spinning out. His first points came in race 13 at Croft, which was stopped early due to rain.

His best result came at Silverstone during a wet race 3, in conditions that he thrives in. He finished 8th overall, passing among others both Tom Chilton and Gordon Shedden in the new style Honda Civic run by Team Dynamics. Doyle's season was constantly hampered with gearbox problems causing various race retirements when top 10 results were looking certain.
Since his season in the BTCC in 2008 Doyle has been hard at work at college obtaining diplomas in both sports remedial massage and personal training as well as a brief stint in the Ginetta GT supercup in 2011 with Beacon racing competing a 3 rounds.

Racing history
After a career in karts (including two Scottish titles in 2002), Doyle contested the 2004 Renault Clio Winter Series. From 2005 to 2007 Doyle raced in the full Renault Clio Cup, which supports the BTCC. He finished 4th overall in 2006, and took a win at Snetterton in 2007. He also took a victory in the equivalent Italian series, in a race at Spa-Francorchamps, Belgium.

Racing record

Complete British Touring Car Championship results
(key) (Races in bold indicate pole position - 1 point awarded in first race) (Races in italics indicate fastest lap - 1 point awarded all races) (* signifies that driver lead race for at least one lap - 1 point awarded all races)

References

External links 
 Michael Doyle official
 Profile at btcc.net
 Profile at BTCCPages.com

Scottish racing drivers
Sportspeople from Glasgow
British Touring Car Championship drivers
1987 births
Living people
Ginetta GT4 Supercup drivers
Renault UK Clio Cup drivers
JHR Developments drivers